Arshinagar is a 2015 Bengali musical romance drama film directed by Aparna Sen. The film features an ensemble cast that includes Dev, Rittika Sen, Jisshu Sengupta, Kaushik Sen, Waheeda Rehman, Kaushik Sen, Kamaleshwar Mukherjee, Roopa Ganguly, Jaya Seal Ghosh. The screenplay is an adaptation of Shakespeare's Romeo and Juliet. The trailer of the film was released on 25 November 2015.

Cast
 Dev as  Ranajit Mitra
 Rittika Sen as Julekha Khan
 Jisshu Sengupta as Tayyab 
 Roopa Ganguly as Tayyab's Mother
 Waheeda Rehman as Dadijaan Ji
 Kamaleshwar Mukherjee as Khan Sahab
 Kaushik Sen as Sabir Khan 
 Shankar Chakraborty as Biswanath Mitra
 Subhashish Mukherjee as Purohit 
 Shantilal Mukherjee as minister
 Jaya Seal Ghosh as Madhu Mitra
 Aparajita Adhya as Najma 
 Swagata Mukherjee as Fahtima
 Paran Bandopadhyay
 Sadif Rayhan
 Anindya Banerjee
 Anirban Bhattacharya as Monty
 Parvathy Baul in a special appearance
 Trina Saha as special appearance
 Priyanka Sarkar as Mrs. Gupta (Herself)
 Shataf Figar (cameo appearance)

Production

Development
The film was announced to be a modern-day take on William Shakespeare's romantic-tragedy Romeo and Juliet. The film would have land mafia as its background, as told by Aparna Sen.
Dev's character is based on Romeo and Rittika Sen's character to be based on Juliet. Dev would essay the role of a member of a band named, Garage Band. Rittika Sen, who made her debut in Borbaad, was selected as the lead heroine because Aparna Sen wanted someone who would look ten years younger than the lead actor, so Sen zeroed on her. Yesteryear legend, Waheeda Rehman, who worked with Aparna Sen in 15 Park Avenue, was selected to essay the role of Rittika's grandmother. Theatre actor Anirban Bhattacharya was initially roped to portray the main antagonist but then Jisshu Sengupta was selected to play the flamboyant negative character etched out on the lines of Tybalt, making his debut as a full-fledged antagonist. Anirban Bhattacharya was later on signed to play a supporting role. Apparently, Roopa Ganguly and Kaushik Sen had been cast as son and daughter of Waheeda Rahman, respectively. Actress Jaya Seal Ghosh and filmmaker Kamaleswar Mukherjee are also part of the film. While Jaya would play Dev's mother, Kamaleswar will be seen as Salim Saab, Rittika's music teacher. Shankar Chakraborty would enact the role of Dev's father, while Shantilal Mukherjee would essay the role of a corrupt politician.

Filming
The muhurat shot was held on 27 January 2015, whose pictures were posted by the makers on Twitter. Dev and Anindya Banerjee started shooting for Aparna Sen's Arshinagar at a city studio on 7 February 2015. Waheeda Rehman joined the shooting on 21 and 22 March.Kamaleshwar Mukherjee started shooting on 17 February 2015. Some scenes were filmed at the Bardhaman Rajbari in Alipore on Sunday afternoon. Besides Kolkata, shooting locations include Adina Mosque of Malda, Purulia and Mumbai.

Box office report 
Arshinagar Movie's total budget was 2.3 Crores and Movie Box office collects total 1.97 crores between 10 Days only. Movie first day Collection was 38 lakhs and opening week collection was 87 lakhs.

References

External links
 
 Arshinagar On Facebook

Films scored by Debojyoti Mishra
Bengali-language Indian films
2010s Bengali-language films
2015 films
2015 romantic drama films
Films based on Romeo and Juliet
Indian romantic drama films
Films shot in West Bengal
Films directed by Aparna Sen